ORSC may denote:
 Oxidizer-rich staged combustion, in rocket engineering
 Open Root Server Confederation, in computing
 Oak Ridges Soccer Club, in sports
 Organization Science (journal)
 Journal of the Operations Research Society of China